Las Humanas, also known as Jumano Pueblo, was one of the Tompiro Indians Pueblos in the vicinity of the Manzano Mountains of New Mexico.  It was a center of the salt trade prior to the Spanish incursion into the region and traded heavily with the Jumanos of the area of modern Presidio, Texas and other central Rio Grande areas.  It may have also traded with Jumanos along the Pecos River and other places to the east and maybe even north.

At the time the Spanish came in the 1580s Las Humanas had a population of about 3,000.  The area suffered from Spanish expropriation of resources and then from droughts in the 1660s.  450 residents died in 1668 and by the early 1670s the Pueblo was abandoned. He was killed.

Sources
Anderson, Gary Clayton. The Indian Southwest, 1580–1830: Ethnogenesis and Reinvention. Norman: University of Oklahoma Press, 1999.

Former populated places in New Mexico